In March 2020, a political crisis took place in the state of Madhya Pradesh, India, due to the resignation of 22 sitting MLAs of the Indian National Congress party from the state's Legislative Assembly. It eventually led to the fall of the Kamal Nath government and the subsequent formation of the fourth Shivraj Singh Chouhan government in Madhya Pradesh.

Timeline
 In November 2018, elections in Madhya Pradesh were held for all constituencies of the Legislative Assembly. Although no party got a majority, the Indian National Congress (INC) was the single largest party in the assembly. They formed the government with the help of one BSP MLA, one SP MLA and four Independent MLAs. Kamal Nath was sworn in as the Chief Minister of Madhya Pradesh.
 On 5 March 2020, 10 MLAs (6 Congress members, 2 from BSP, 1 from SP and 1 Independent), flew to Delhi. 6 of these MLAs initially returned. The remaining 4 MLAs then flew to Bengaluru, where Congress MLA Hardeep Dang resigned from the party. The remaining three MLAs returned soon and denied the claims, made by other Congress leaders, that they were a part of horse-trading.
 On 10 March 2020, a senior leader of INC, Jyotiraditya Scindia suddenly went to meet Prime Minister Narendra Modi, and Amit Shah, Home Minister of India. After meeting them, at around 11:30 am, he resigned from the Congress party, saying that he felt very guilty while working for Congress.
 The next day (11 March), at around 3:00 pm, he joined Bharatiya Janata Party in the presence of Jagat Prakash Nadda, National President of Bharatiya Janata Party. After joining the party, he slammed Chief Minister of Madhya Pradesh, Kamal Nath and other Congress leaders for not giving the importance in the party. Throughout his press conference, he didn't mention the names of the Nehru-Gandhi Family. After joining the party, he was given the ticket of Rajya Sabha from Madhya Pradesh by Shivraj Singh Chouhan.
 Both the parties (INC and BJP) approached the Supreme Court (SC) to ask for a floor test in Madhya Pradesh. On 19 March 2020, the SC ordered that the floor test in the Madhya Pradesh Legislative Assembly should be done by 5:00 pm, of 20 March 2020.
 On 20 March 2020, after a press conference at noon, the Chief Minister Kamal Nath tendered his resignation.
 On 21 March 2020, in Delhi, all the 22 rebel ex-Congress MLAs joined the Bharatiya Janata Party, in presence of BJP's national president J P Nadda.
 On 23 March 2020, Shivraj Singh Chouhan took oath as the new Chief Minister.

Later events
 By 23 July 2020, another 3 Congress MLAs (Pradyuman Singh Lodhi (of Malhara), Sumitra Devi Kasdekar (of Nepanagar) and Narayan Patel (of Mandhata)) had resigned to join the BJP.
 On 3 November 2020, by-elections were conducted in the constituencies of all the resigning members to fill the vacant seats.

List of MLAs who resigned

Outcome
A new government was formed by Shivraj Singh Chouhan as Chief Minister of Madhya Pradesh of the Bharatiya Janata Party.

Due to these resignations, by-elections needed to be held for all these constituencies. The 2020 Madhya Pradesh Legislative Assembly by-elections were carried out in November 2020. 18 of the 25 MLAs involved in the crises, won their seats back as BJP candidates and the BJP government retained their majority in the Legislative Assembly.

See also 

 2019 Karnataka political crisis
 2019 Maharashtra political crisis
 2020 Rajasthan political crisis 
 2020 Madhya Pradesh Legislative Assembly by-elections

References

Political crises in India
2020 in Indian politics
Politics of Madhya Pradesh
2020s in Madhya Pradesh